Thomas Pritzker (born June 6, 1950) is an American billionaire heir and businessman. A member of the Pritzker family, he is the chairman and chief executive officer (CEO) of the Pritzker Organization (TPO), which manages the various Pritzker family business assets, and the executive chairman of the Hyatt Hotels Corporation.

Early life
Thomas Pritzker was born on June 6, 1950, the son of Jay Pritzker (1922–99) and his wife, Marian Friend. He holds a JD and an MBA from the University of Chicago, and a BA from Claremont McKenna College.

Career
He is founder (2011) and chairman of North America Western Asia Holdings LLC (Nawah), an investment and advisory firm seeking to invest in Iraqi companies while advising clients looking to do business in the region.

Philanthropy
He is the past chairman of the Art Institute of Chicago and the Center for Strategic and International Studies. He organized the Pritzker Neuropsychiatric Disorders Research Consortium. Along with his wife, Tom supports Rare, an international conservation organization.

Personal life
He is married to Margot Marshall; they have three sons.

References

1950 births
American people of Ukrainian-Jewish descent
Living people
Thomas Pritzker
Hyatt people
Place of birth missing (living people)
American billionaires
University of Chicago Booth School of Business alumni
University of Chicago Law School alumni
University of Chicago alumni
CSIS people
21st-century American Jews